The van Harinxmakanaal is a major canal in western Frisland. It runs from the sea at Harlingen eastwards to Leeuwarden. Major places along the canal include Franeker, Dronrijp and Deinum. The canal is 37.5 kilometers long. It was named after Pieter Albert Vincent van Harinxma thoe Slooten in 1950 who was King's Commissioner to Friesland from 1909 to 1945. Prior to this date it was called Harlinger Trekvaart.  However this was widened and deepened, and a few corners cut off in 1951. At Suawoude it joins the Prinses Margrietkanaal.

The lock Tsjerk Hiddessluizen situated at the connection to the Harlingen harbour maintains the water level in the canal. The canal water level is connected to the water system called Friese boezem, consisting of lakes, waterways and canals in Friesland.

See also 
 Dronrijp Reprisals

References

Canals in the Netherlands